Samaradasa Weerahandi, is the first Sri Lankan American statistician to be honored as a Fellow of the American Statistical Association.  Also known as Sam Weerahandi, he is a former professor last employed in Corporate America by Pfizer, Inc. as a Senior Director until December 2016.

Weerahandi obtained his PhD in statistics at the University of British Columbia in 1977 under the supervision of Stanley Nash.

Weerahandi introduced a number of notions, concepts, and methods for statistical analysis of small samples based on exact probability statements, which are referred to as exact statistics.

 Commonly known as generalized inferences, the new concepts include generalized p-value generalized confidence intervals and generalized point estimation. These methods, which are discussed in the two books he wrote, have been found to produce more accurate inferences compared to classical methods based on asymptotic methods when the sample size is small or when large samples tends to be noisy. 
 He used statistical techniques based on these notions to bring statistical practice into business management.

Leadership Highlights

A Founding Member of FOSUS (Friends of Sri Lanka and Sri Lankan Americans in US):
A leading member in forming US Congressional Caucus on Sri Lanka and the Sri Lankan Americans
Served as primary speaker and organizer of Community meetings with the US Congress
Led Diversity Communications with
Pfizer executives that lead to the appointment of first Indian American EVP reporting to the CEO and promoting many Asian Americans
Time Warner executives that resulted in the promotion of the first Indian American to a GM level job
President of Time/Warner that resulted in the promotion of the first African American to VP level
Primary speaker at community events organized by
Sri Lankan Ambassadors to US
Sri Lankan Ambassadors to UN
Founded the Federation of South Asian Artists in US and successfully communicated with all media and entertainment companies for increased diversity in casting in Time Warner companies and featuring them in Time Inc. magazines.

Bibliography
Exact Statistical Methods for Data Analysis", Springer-Verlag, New York, 1995
Generalized Inference in Repeated
Measures: Exact Methods in MANOVA and Mixed Models. Wiley, Hoboken, New Jersey, 2004.

References

Ananda, M. M. A. (2003). Confidence intervals for steady state availability of a system with exponential operating time and lognormal repair time. Applied Mathematics and Computation, 137, 499-509.
Bebu, I., and Mathew, T. (2009). Confidence intervals for limited moments and truncated moments in normal and lognormal models. Statistics and Probability Letters, 79, 375-380
Gamage, J., Mathew, T. and Weerahandi S. (2013). Generalized prediction intervals for BLUPs in mixed models, Journal of
Multivariate Analysis, 220, 226-233.
Hamada, M., and Weerahandi, S. (2000). Measurement System Assessment via Generalized Inference. Journal of Quality Technology,  32, 241-253.
Hanning, J., Iyer, H., and Patterson, P. (2006). Fiducial generalized confidence intervals. Journal of the American Statistical Association, 101, 254-269.
Krishnamoorthy, K., and Mathew, T. (2009). Statistical Tolerance Regions, Wiley Series in Probability and Statistics.
Lee, J. C., and Lin, S. H. (2004). Generalized confidence intervals for the ratio of means of two normal populations. Journal of Statistical Planning and Inference, 123, 49-60.
 Li, X., Wang J., Liang H. (2011). Comparison of several means: a fiducial based approach.
Computational Statistics and Data Analysis}, 55, 1993-2002.
Tian, L. (2008). Generalized Inferences on the Overall Treatment Effect in Meta-analysis with Normally Distributed Outcomes, Biometrical Journal, 50, 237-247.
Mathew, T. and Webb, D. W. (2005).  Generalized  p-values and confidence intervals for variance components: 
Applications to Army test and evaluation, Technometrics, 47, 312-322.
Mu, W., and Wang, X. (2014). Inference for One-Way ANOVA with Equicorrelation Error Structure, The Scientific World Journal.
Tsui, K., and Weerahandi, S. (1989). Generalized p-Values in Significance Testing of Hypotheses in the Presence of Nuisance Parameters. JASA, 18, 586-589.
Xiong S. (2011). An asymptotics look at the generalized inference, Journal of Multivariate Analysis, 102, 336–348.
Weerahandi, S. (1993). Generalized Confidence Intervals. JASA, 88, 899-905.
Wu, J.F., and Hamada, M.S. (2009). Experiments: Planning, Analysis, and Optimization, Wiles Series in Probability and Statistics.

External links
 Home Page

Living people
American people of Sri Lankan descent
American statisticians
Sinhalese academics
Fellows of the American Statistical Association
Year of birth missing (living people)
University of British Columbia alumni
Alumni of the University of Sri Jayewardenepura